Artūras Milaknis (born 16 June 1986) is a Lithuanian professional basketball for Tofaş of Basketbol Süper Ligi (BSL).

Early career
A native of Kaunas, Milaknis began his career in the second division National Basketball League (NKL), playing for Bremena Tauragė. In 2006, he went on to play with Žalgiris-Arvydas Sabonis school, the junior team of Žalgiris Kaunas.

Professional career
In the 2007-2008 season, Milaknis made his Žalgiris' main team debut. Since then, apart from playing two full seasons in 2009–2010 and 2010–2011, he would be loaned to a few different teams, up until 2013, when he signed a 2+1 deal after a successful season with BC Prienai. In the next two years, he became an important part of the team, and soon gained attention from various international clubs. In the summer of 2015, Milaknis was invited to join the Dallas Mavericks training camp. On July 9, 2015, he signed a two-year contract with the Russian club UNICS Kazan.

On August 7, 2016, Milaknis returned to Žalgiris as he signed a three-year contract. It was extended for an additional year on June 7, 2019. 

On October 14, 2022, he has signed with Tofaş of Basketbol Süper Ligi (BSL).

National team career
In 2015, Milaknis was included into the senior Lithuanian national team extended candidates list, by the team's head coach, Jonas Kazlauskas. At age of 29, he qualified into the final roster of the senior Lithuanian national team, for the first time in his career, and he represented the national team at the EuroBasket 2015.  The Lithuanian team ended up winning the silver medal at the tournament.

He played at the EuroBasket 2017.

Career statistics

EuroLeague

|-
| style="text-align:left;"| 2007–08
| style="text-align:left;" rowspan=12| Žalgiris
| 2 || 0 || 2.5 || .500 || .000 || .000 || .0 || .0 || .0 || .0 || 1.0 || .5
|-
| style="text-align:left;"| 2008–09
| 5 || 0 || 14.8 || .611 || .571 || .500 || 1.2 || .2 || .0 || .0 || 6.2 || 5.0
|-
| style="text-align:left;"| 2009–10
| 11 || 0 || 8.0 || .500 || .500 || .500 || .4 || .0 || .3 || .0 || 2.5 || 1.0
|-
| style="text-align:left;"| 2010–11
| 15 || 9 || 15.5 || .368 || .308 || .800 || 1.0 || .4 || .7 || .0 || 3.9 || 1.3
|-
| style="text-align:left;"| 2013–14
| 24 || 4 || 18.3 || .458 || .432 || .667 || 2.0 || .7 || .3 || .0 || 6.4 || 4.8
|-
| style="text-align:left;"| 2014–15
| 24 || 10 || 25.9 || .462 || .462 || .778 || 1.8 || 1.4 || .3 || .1 || 10.0 || 8.0
|-
| style="text-align:left;"| 2016–17
| 30 || 8 || 21.1 || .474 || .386 || .762 || 1.5 || 1.0 || .3 || .0 || 7.3 || 4.6
|-
| style="text-align:left;"| 2017–18
| 36 || 8 || 22.4 || .471 || .449 || .826 || 2.0 || .9 || .4 || .1 || 8.0 || 6.6
|-
| style="text-align:left;"| 2018–19
| 34 || 10 || 23.1 || .403 || .417 || .853 || 1.4 || .9 || .6 || .1 || 7.0 || 5.3
|-
| style="text-align:left;"| 2019–20
| 28 || 10 || 21.6 || .466 || .395 || .833 || 1.5 || .6 || .9 || .0 || 7.4 || 6.7
|-
| style="text-align:left;"| 2020–21
| 25 || 12 || 18.2 || .473 || .470 || 1.000 || 1.0 || .7 || .5 || .1 || 6.0 || 5.6
|-
| style="text-align:left;"| 2021–22
| 31 || 5 || 20.2 || .428 || .416 || .931 || .9 || .6 || .5 || .1 || 7.3 || 6.0
|-
|- class="sortbottom"
| style="text-align:center;" colspan=2| Career
| 265 || 76 || 20.2 || .439 || .425 || .826 || 1.4 || .8 || .5 || .1 || 6.9 || 5.1

References

External links
 Artūras Milaknis at euroleague.net
 Artūras Milaknis at eurobasket.com
 Artūras Milaknis at fiba.com

1986 births
Living people
Basketball players from Kaunas
BC Prienai players
BC UNICS players
BC Žalgiris players
Lithuanian expatriate basketball people in Russia
Lithuanian men's basketball players
LSU-Atletas basketball players
Shooting guards
Small forwards
Tofaş S.K. players